AJR is an American indie pop trio composed of multi-instrumentalist brothers Adam, Jack, and Ryan Metzger (shortened as Met). Their most successful songs include "I'm Ready", "Sober Up", "Burn the House Down", "Way Less Sad", "100 Bad Days", "Weak", "World's Smallest Violin", "Bang!", "I Won't" and “The DJ Is Crying For Help”. In 2019, their third album Neotheater debuted at number 8 on the Billboard 200, and hit number one on the Top Rock Albums chart. "Bang!" is their highest-charting song and only song to reach the top 10 in the United States, peaking at number 8 on the Billboard Hot 100 on January 20, 2021.

The name "AJR" comes from the first initials of the three brothers, Adam, Jack, and Ryan. The band writes, produces, and mixes their music in the living room of their apartment in Chelsea. Their musical style has been described as "eclectic", combining elements of pop, electronic, and dubstep.

History

2005–2013: Formation and debut album 
The Met brothers initially began writing, producing, and mixing their own material in the living room of their Chelsea apartment in Manhattan, New York, focusing on DIY indie pop music. They began performing around 2006, busking in Central Park and Washington Square Park. Initially, Jack played the harmonica, Ryan played the piano, and Adam played the bass. They later began playing various instruments. They began by performing covers, and have also put out 2 albums in 2010 and an EP in 2012 (which are now removed from all streaming services.).

In November 2012, AJR's Ryan Met tweeted a link to a video of their song "I'm Ready" to about 80 celebrities, including Australian singer Sia. Sia told her manager about the song, and he contacted Steve Greenberg, former president of Columbia Records and current CEO and Founder of S-Curve Records. He acts as their co-manager. AJR's debut single, "I'm Ready", which features a sample of SpongeBob SquarePants repeatedly singing his catchphrase "I'm ready" from the eponymous animated series' premiere episode, was commercially released on August 22, 2013. The song was placed in regular rotation on Sirius XM Radio's Top 20 on 20 and Hits 1 stations, and they performed the song on Good Day New York and VH1's Big Morning Buzz. The official music video for "I'm Ready" premiered on VEVO on October 15, 2013.

AJR released their debut EP, 6foot1 (later renamed I'm Ready after the band signed to Warner Music Group), on December 20, 2013. They were named Clear Channel's "Artist on the Rise" for the month of October 2013. By 2014, the band was already named IHeartRadio's Artist of the Month for Top 40 in January, and a Myspace "One to Watch" in February, while "I'm Ready" officially impacted pop radio in April. As of August 2022, the music video for "I'm Ready" had reached 39 million views on YouTube. Many thousands of singles sold each week, features in Billboard and the New York Post, while climbing the Top 40 chart. "I'm Ready" hit number one on Next Big Sound's chart in May 2014. The band performed the song on Today on July 29, 2014. "I'm Ready" had been certified Platinum in Canada and Australia.

2014–2015: Infinity and Living Room

The band's second EP, Infinity, was released on September 23, 2014. It contains 5 tracks, including the lead single "Infinity". They released a lyric video for the single. A majority of the work for the video was done by AJR, including directing and producing. The EP was released instead of their debut album, Living Room, which was pushed back to a release date of March 3, 2015. The band expressed the delay in their debut album was because they wanted to add some of their newer music to the project. 

Around this time, the brothers began to take on distinctive appearances. Adam grew a full beard (later he would grow his hair long), Jack also grew a beard and would wear a bomber hat (which he admits is his mother's), and Ryan wore glasses, was clean shaven, and had a cowlick hairstyle.

On October 23, 2015, they released a bonus track from the album called "Let The Games Begin".

2016–2018: The Click 

The brothers released their third EP, titled What Everyone's Thinking, on September 16, 2016, which features the lead single "Weak". The lead single was written by the band within a few hours, without any idea of the future success the single would have. "Weak" had been certified Platinum in the U.S., Canada, Norway, Netherlands and Belgium, and Gold in Germany, Italy, Sweden, and Australia. It has over 600 million streams on Spotify.

The band released its second studio album, The Click, on June 9, 2017, featuring the singles "Weak", "Drama" and "Sober Up", which features frontman Rivers Cuomo from Weezer, who co-wrote the track. This song reached number one on the Mediabase Alternative Singles chart in 2018. The band's 2018 tour in support of the album, The Click Tour, featured Hundred Handed, Grizfolk, Ocean Park Standoff, and MAX as openers.

In 2017, AJR released "It's On Us", a single written in collaboration with the It's On Us campaign, which was launched by Barack Obama in 2014 to combat sexual assault on college campuses across the United States.

An extended version of The Click was released on September 21, 2018. The Click (Deluxe Edition) included new tracks such as "Role Models", "Normal" and "Burn the House Down", the latter which the band released in March 2018 as a single and reached number two on the Mediabase Alternative Singles chart. Also included was "Pretender – Acoustic", an acoustic version of "Pretender", which was a collaboration between AJR, EDM artist Steve Aoki and American rapper Lil Yachty.

2019: Neotheater 

On January 30, 2019, AJR released "100 Bad Days", the first single for their then-unannounced album: Neotheater. A music video was released on March 8. The song was included on Taylor Swift's Apple Music playlist, "Playlist by ME!" in May 2019. The lyrics, "maybe a hundred bad days made a hundred good stories, a hundred good stories make me interesting at parties," are used in Taylor's description of this playlist of songs she loves and appreciates. On March 5, the band teased the second single, "Birthday Party". On March 11, the band announced their third studio album, Neotheater, which was to be released on April 26. "100 Bad Days" was performed on Jimmy Kimmel Live! on March 11. On March 11, the promotional single, "Birthday Party" was released. The second single, "Dear Winter", was teased on April 1, and released on April 5, with a music video being released later that same day. The album debuted on April 26 at number one on Billboards Top Alternative Albums, number one on Billboards Top Rock Albums, and number eight on Billboards Top 200 Albums. 

On October 25, the group released "Dear Winter 2.0", re-imagining the song by "changing the production and upping the emotion".

2021–2022: OK Orchestra and major label signing 

On February 12, 2020, the single "Bang!" was released, with a music video following the next day. The single at its release was intended to be part of the deluxe version of their album Neotheater, but was scrapped and made the lead single for OK Orchestra. A follow-up single was released on August 31, 2020, titled "Bummerland". On December 22, 2020, AJR released "My Play". AJR then took to their Twitter account and other social media accounts to announce OK Orchestra, on December 20, 2020. On February 17, 2021, the band released "Way Less Sad" with a music video on the same day. OK Orchestra was then released on March 26, 2021. The album has 13 tracks, including "Ordinaryish People" with the Blue Man Group. On March 21, 2021, AJR released OKO World, an interactive game on AJR's website. The new merchandise for the album was released on March 23. Their success with the song "Bang!" led them to win a Billboard Music Award for "Top Rock Song" In 2021. On August 30, they released a remix of "The Record Player Song" entitled "Record Player" with its original performers Daisy the Great in which they added their own verses and production.

On November 24, 2021, the band released a music video for their song “The Good Part” from their 2017 album The Click after its sudden spike popularity due to being featured on TikTok and YouTube Shorts.

The band released a music video for "Ordinaryish People" on February 9, 2022.

In May 2022, AJR signed to Mercury Records, a subsidiary of Universal Music Group.

Harold and the Purple Crayon 
On March 11, 2022, the band announced that they will be working in collaboration with theatre producer Vivek J. Tiwary in a Broadway adaptation of the children's book Harold and the Purple Crayon. The show will be produced by Tiwary's TEG+, with original songs by the band. On September 23, 2022, it was announced that the book for the musical will be written by playwrights Robert Quillen Camp and Dan Rothenberg. This adaptation will feature Harold in a later stage of life compared to the books, with the band releasing a statement saying, "We adored Harold and the Purple Crayon growing up, and we thought: what if we saw Harold as a young adult, realizing that his problems are too profound to simply draw away". As of yet, no release date for the show has been announced.

2023: TMM 
On April 22, 2022, the band announced that a new song would be releasing before the OK Orchestra Tour resumed. They shared a snippet of the song along with a presave link that showed that the song was titled "???", with numerous outlets calling the song "I Won't". This was apparently confirmed as the official name as the setlist for the OK Orchestra tour has it listed as such. "I Won't" was officially released on July 29, 2022, with its accompanying music video released a day later.

In June 2022, the band teased an upcoming fifth album on Twitter, with the caption "Think we just wrote our next album opener".

On November 6, 2022, the band released the final episode of the OK Orchestra Tour Documentary alongside a tweet that read "Final OKO Tour Doc is out on YouTube now. What a time. The next time we post will be a new era announcement. See you soon".

On November 11, 2022, the band released an image of a logo that read "TMM" alongside the caption "TOMORROW".

On November 12, 2022, the band released a video teaser announcing the new era alongside the caption "A NEW ERA HAS BEGUN. TMM".

On November 13, 2022, the band announced that a new single titled "The DJ is Crying for Help" was releasing very soon. Multiple snippets of the song were released prior to the reveal. On November 18, the song made its official debut, accompanied with its music video right after.

On January 27, 2023, Quinn XCII released "Too Late", featuring AJR. The song appeared as track 7 on Quinn's fifth studio album, The People's Champ. The single came after the cancellation of 2020's Everything Everywhere Tour, which would have seen both artists performing alongside each other.

On January 9, 2023, AJR posted a short teaser for an upcoming TMM song, featuring Ryan producing on his laptop and Jack playing his guitar. The internet nicknamed it "Shitty Stuff", regarding a prominent lyric in the clip. Alongside the teaser, they said that they were "in the middle of creating the biggest tour [they've] ever announced". The pop trio haven't posted any more teasers since.

Tours and concerts 
 I'm Ready Tour (2014)
 The Infinity Tour (2014)
 Living Room Tour (2015)
 What Everyone's Thinking Tour (2017)
 What Everyone's Thinking Tour Part 2 (2017)
 The Click Tour (2018)
 The Click Tour Part 2 (2018)
 Neotheater World Tour (2019)
 Neotheater World Tour Part II (2020) (Cancelled due to COVID-19)
 Everything Everywhere Tour (2020) (Cancelled due to COVID-19)
 A Night in Your Car with AJR (2020)
 One Spectacular Night (2020)
OK Orchestra Tour (2021–2022)
One More Spectacular Night (2021) (replaying of "One Spectacular Night")

AJR has opened for Fifth Harmony, Lindsey Stirling, Hoodie Allen, Train, Fitz and the Tantrums, Andy Grammer, We the Kings, Demi Lovato, Ingrid Michaelson, Sammy Adams, American Authors, and Melanie Martinez.

Their Neotheater World Tour took the band to Belgium, Germany, the United Kingdom, France, The Netherlands, Ireland, and Poland in November 2019. On November 13, 2019, the group announced the Neotheater World Tour Part 2. Dates were released on November 15.

The OK Orchestra Tour also saw AJR performing in Oceania for the first time in their history.

COVID-19 alternate concerts

On May 14, 2020, the band announced the cancellation of their upcoming tours due to the COVID-19 pandemic, stating via Twitter that "it’s more important to us that [our fans] are safe".

On July 21, 2020, AJR announced their drive-in show "A night in your car with AJR" which took place on August 19, 2020, in Philadelphia. Two days later after the first show had sold out entirely, they announced a second show for Philadelphia which took place on August 20, 2020. This is also where they first sang their song “Bummerland”.

On November 19, 2020, AJR announced their first virtual concert, AJR's One Spectacular Night, which took place on December 26, 2020. It was interactive, with features such as allowing you to clap after songs, change the camera you're viewing through, along with other interactive features to both simulate a typical live concert and experiment with the benefits of livestreaming.

Band members

Core members
 Adam Met – vocals, bass guitar, programming, samples, percussion
 Jack Met – lead vocals, guitar, melodica, ukulele, drums, percussion, keyboards, banjo, synthesizers, samples, programming, cowbell
 Ryan Met – vocals, programming, keyboards, ukulele, producing, samples

Auxiliary members
The following instrumentalists have toured and recorded with AJR:

Current
 Chris Berry – drums, percussion
 Arnetta Johnson – trumpet, keyboards

Former
 JJ Kirkpatrick – trumpet, keyboards, percussion

Personal lives
The brothers have described themselves as "culturally Jewish". Their parents are Gary Metzger, an architect, and Laurie Marvald, who began her career as an architect, attending Cornell University, then moving on to entrepreneurship. Laurie was the original founder and manager of AJR, creating and developing the band. Laurie also was a co-founder of AJR Productions, LLC and served as co-manager of the band until 2022. The 3 members of AJR grew up in Bayside, Queens until moving to Chelsea, Manhattan in 2001. There, Jack attended the Professional Children's School in Manhattan. Jack was a child actor, appearing in The Pink Panther 2 as well as an episode of Law and Order: Criminal Intent. 

Adam received a BA from Columbia University, majoring in business and philosophy, an MA from New York University, and PhD in International Human Rights Law from the University of Birmingham, while Ryan and Jack studied film at Columbia University.

Ryan has synesthesia and has said it helps him with his music production process, stating in a YouTube video: "I see visuals when I'm hearing the music, and that very much helps when I'm building … and choosing the right drums".

Ryan and Jack live in the same apartment and have a Bouvier dog named Shay.

During the band's OK Orchestra Tour, Jack announced that he had been diagnosed with OCD in 2017.

Discography 

 Living Room (2015)
 The Click (2017)
 Neotheater (2019)
 OK Orchestra (2021)
 TMM (2023)

Awards and nominations 
American Music Awards

Billboard Music Awards

iHeartRadio Music Awards

Teen Choice Awards

See also 

 List of indie pop artists
List of artists who reached number one on the U.S. alternative rock chart

References 
https://www.allmusic.com/artist/ajr-mn0003243113/biography

External links 

2005 establishments in New York City
Musical groups established in 2005
Indie pop groups from New York (state)
Sibling musical trios
American musical trios
Jewish musical groups
Universal Music Group artists
Mercury Records artists